Meanwhile EP is an extended play by English virtual band Gorillaz, released on 26 August 2021. The EP was released as a celebration of Notting Hill Carnival in London, England, an annual event that was canceled in 2021 due to the COVID-19 pandemic.

Background

On 29 June 2021, Damon Albarn revealed in an interview with NME that Gorillaz was working on new "carnival-themed music", saying that their upcoming record would return to the band's roots.

On 10 August 2021, Gorillaz debuted three new songs, "Meanwhile" (featuring British rapper Jelani Blackman), "Jimmy Jimmy" (featuring British rapper AJ Tracey), and "Déjà Vu" (featuring Jamaican singer Alicaì Harley), during a free concert at The O2 Arena in London, England exclusively for National Health Service employees and their families. They then performed them again at the subsequent concert open to the public the next day (both of which served as the first live audience concerts of the Song Machine Tour).

Track listing
All tracks are written by Damon Albarn, Remi Kabaka Jr., and the tracks' respective guest(s).

Personnel 

Gorillaz
 Damon Albarn – vocals, production , bass, keyboards , steelpans , guitar, melodica 
 Jamie Hewlett – artwork, design
 Stephen Sedgwick – mixing 
 Remi Kabaka Jr. – production, percussion , drum programming 
 John Davis – mastering
 Samuel Egglenton – engineering 
 Femi Koleoso – drums 
 Mike Smith – keyboards 
 Jeff Wootton – guitar 
 Jesse Hackett – keyboards 
 Karl Vanden Bossche – percussion 
 Seye Adelekan – bass 

Additional musicians
 Jelani Blackman – vocals 
 Barrington Levy – vocals 
 Jorja Smith – additional vocals 
 Isabelle Dunn – cello 
 Nina Foster – violin 
 Oli Langford – violin 
 Sarah Tuke – violin 
 AJ Tracey – vocals 
 Alicaì Harley – vocals 
 Ade Omotayo – additional vocals 
 Angel Silvera – additional vocals 
 Matt Maijah – additional vocals 
 Michelle Ndegwa – additional vocals 
 Petra Luke – additional vocals 
 Rebecca Freckleton – additional vocals 

Additional technical
 Alicaì Harley – programming 
 Dave Guerin – engineering 
 Matt Butcher – engineering, mixing

References 

2021 EPs
Gorillaz albums
Albums produced by Damon Albarn
Albums recorded at Studio 13
Parlophone EPs
Warner Records EPs